EGF-like module-containing mucin-like hormone receptor-like 1 also known as F4/80 is a protein encoded by the ADGRE1 gene. EMR1 is a member of the adhesion GPCR family.
Adhesion GPCRs are characterized by an extended extracellular region often possessing N-terminal protein modules that is linked to a TM7 region via a domain known as the GPCR-Autoproteolysis INducing (GAIN) domain.

EMR1 expression in human is restricted to eosinophils and is a specific marker for these cells. The murine homolog of EMR1, F4/80, is a well-known and widely used marker of murine macrophage populations. The N-terminal fragment (NTF) of EMR1 contains 4-6 Epidermal Growth Factor-like (EGF-like) domains in human and 4-7 EGF-like domains in the mouse.

Function 
Utilizing F4/80 knockout mice, Lin et al. showed that F4/80 is not necessary for the development of tissue macrophages but is required for the induction of efferent CD8+ regulatory T cells needed for peripheral tolerance.

Clinical significance 
Legrand et al. demonstrated that EMR1 can serve as a therapeutic target for depletion of these cells in eosinophilic disorders by using afucosylated antibodies.

See also 
 EGF module-containing mucin-like hormone receptor

References

External links 
 GPCR consortium

G protein-coupled receptors